Otsjanep is a village in Asmat Regency, South Papua, Indonesia. The village is located on the bank of the Ewta river
at the far north end of Indonesia's Casuarina Coast, named for its casuarina trees but now disappearing due to logging.
Otsjanep is renowned for its wood carving. The locals continue to wear traditional clothes, but the village has a modern missionary church and – unusual in this area – grass lawns.

References

Villages in South Papua
Asmat Regency